Houshang Golshiri (March 16, 1938 – June 5, 2000) was an Iranian fiction writer, critic and editor. He was one of the first Iranian writers to use modern literary techniques, and is recognized as one of the most influential writers of Persian prose of the 20th century.

Biography

Early life
Golshiri was born  in Isfahan in 1938 and raised in Abadan. He came from a large family of modest circumstances. From 1955 to 1974, Golshiri lived in Isfahan, where he completed a bachelor's degree in Persian at the University of Isfahan and taught elementary and high school there and in surrounding towns.

Writing career
Golshiri began writing fiction in the late 1950s. His publication of short stories in Payam-e Novin and elsewhere in the early 1960s, his establishment of Jong-e Isfahan (1965/73), the chief literary journal of the day published outside of  Tehran, and his participation in efforts to reduce official censorship of imaginative literature brought him a reputation in literary circles.

Golshiri's first collection of short stories was As Always (1968). He became famous for his first novel Prince Ehtejab (1968/69). Translated in Literature East & West 20 (1980), it is the story of aristocratic decadence, implying the inappropriateness of monarchy for Iran. Shortly after production of the popular feature film based on the novel, Pahlavi authorities arrested Golshiri and incarcerated him for nearly six months.

An autobiographical and less successful novel called Christine and Kid came out in 1971, followed by a collection of short stories called My Little Prayer Room 1975, and a novel called Ra'i's Lost Lamb 1977.

In 1978, Golshiri travelled to the United States. Back in Iran in early 1979, Golshiri married Farzaneh Taheri whom he credits with editing his subsequent writing and was active in the revitalized Association of Iranian Writers, the editing of journals, literary criticism, and short-story writing. In the 1980s, he published The Fifth Innocent (1980), The Antique Chamber (1983), The Story of the Fisherman and the Demon (1984), and Five Treasures (1989), which he published in Stockholm during a visit to Europe in 1989. In 1990, under a pseudonym, Golshiri published a novella in translation called King of the Benighted, an indictment of Iranian monarchy, engage Persian literature, the Tudeh Party, and the Islamic Republic. A collection of Golshiri stories in translation was scheduled for publication in 1991 with the title Blood and Aristocrats and Other Stories.

In the winter of 1998 he published The Book of Genies and  Struggle of Image with Painter, and in the autumn of 1999 he released a collection of articles called Garden in Garden.

In 1999 Golshiri was awarded the Erich-Maria Remarque Peace Prize for his struggle to promote democracy and human rights in Iran.

International Speeches and Readings

In 1989, in his first trip abroad after the revolution, Golshiri went to the Netherlands along with various cities in the UK and Sweden to give speeches and readings. In 1990, he traveled to the House of World Cultures in Berlin, Germany.
On this trip, he spoke and gave readings in various cities in Germany, Sweden, Denmark and France. In the spring two years later, he went to Germany, the United States, Sweden, and Belgium. In 1993, he visited Germany, the Netherlands, and Belgium again.

Death

He died at Iran Mehr Hospital in Tehran on 5 June 2000 at the age of 62 after suffering from meningitis.

Golshiri Foundation
A cultural foundation was established after his death. It runs the prestigious Hooshang Golshiri Literary Awards.

Works
 The Book of Genies (Jen Nameh)
 Struggle of Image with Painter (Jedal-e Naghsh ba Naghash)
 Garden in Garden (Bagh dar Bagh)
 The Story of the Fisherman and the Demon (Hadis-e Mahigir va Div)
 The Fifth Innocent (Massoum-e Panjom)
 Five Treasures (Panj Ganj)
 Christine and Kid (Keristin va Kid)
 Ra'i's Lost Lamb (volume 1): Burial of the Living (Barreh-ye Gomshodeh-ye ra'i: (jeld-e Avval) tadfin-e Zendegan)
 My Little Prayer Room (Namazkhaneh-ye kuchek-e man)
 As Always (Mesl-e hamisheh)
 Prince Ehtejab (Shazdeh ehtejab)
  The Antique Chamber (Jobbeh'khaneh)

Adaptations
 The novel Prince Ehtejab (Shazdeh Ehtejab) was adapted into a film with the same title by Bahman Farmanara,1974
 The short story First Innocent (Masoome Aval) was adapted into a film with the title "Tall Shadows of the Wind" (Sayehaye Bolande Bad) by Bahman Farmanara,1978
 In 2013, Ali Zare Ghanat Nowi released Dad's Fragile Doll which narrates the story of a political prisoner who has a kid. The family gets upset with arresting the father but the girl dreams about killing the man who arrested him. The screenplay was adopted from a story by Houshang Golshiri with the same title. It won the best animation of veteran's festival in Australia.

See also
Persian literature

References

External links
 Golshiri foundation
 

Iranian male short story writers
Iranian male novelists
Iranian novelists
Writers from Isfahan
Burials at Emamzadeh Taher
1938 births
2000 deaths
20th-century novelists
Iranian fiction writers
International Writing Program alumni
20th-century Iranian short story writers
20th-century male writers
Deaths from meningitis
Neurological disease deaths in Iran
Infectious disease deaths in Iran
Iranian Writers Association members